Alexander Rossipal (born 6 June 1996) is a German professional footballer who plays as a defender for Waldhof Mannheim.

References

External links
 

1996 births
Living people
Footballers from Stuttgart
German footballers
Germany youth international footballers
Association football defenders
TSG 1899 Hoffenheim II players
TSG 1899 Hoffenheim players
SV Sandhausen players
SC Preußen Münster players
SV Waldhof Mannheim players
Regionalliga players
2. Bundesliga players
3. Liga players